Colonel Alfred McCormack, CBE (1901-1956), was a trained attorney of Cravath, Swaine & Moore who during and after World War II served in the US Military Intelligence Service, where he proved crucial in developing military analysis of cryptographic intercepts in Operation Magic.

Background
Alfred T. McCormack was born on January 13, 1901, in Brooklyn, New York.  In 1921, he graduated Phi Beta Kappa from Princeton University and in 1925 received a law degree from Columbia University in 1921.

Career
In 1926, McCormack clerked for Supreme Court Justice Harlan Fiske Stone.  Later that year, he joined a Wall Street law firm of Cravath, de Gersdorff, Swaine and Wood (whose name became Cravath, Swaine & Moore in 1944), where he became a partner in 1935.

In June 1942, McCormack received a commission as colonel in the US Military Intelligence Service, known as the Military Intelligence Corps as part of the US Department of War's general staff.  He became deputy chief of a special intelligence organization and worked closely with British intelligence on procedure and in exchanges of personnel, formation, and intelligence.  (As part of the 1943 BRUSA Agreement, McCormack, Colonel Telford Taylor of Military Intelligence, and Lieutenant Colonel William Friedman visited Bletchley Park in April 1943, where they worked with Commander Edward Travis (RN), head of the British communications intelligence (COMINT) facility, and shared their solution to the Japanese Purple machine.)  On July 1, 1944, he became Director of Intelligence for theMilitary Intelligence Service.  Discharged in October 1945, he became a special assistant to the Secretary of State as head of State's new Research and Intelligence Unit.  

Crucially, "McCormack saw the folly of sending raw intercepts to busy decision-makers."  He advocated that lawyers conduct cryptographic analysis.   In May 1942, McCormack established the Special Branch of MIS which specialised in COMINT.

McCormack was involved in The Pond (intelligence organization).

McCormack opposed the use of Black (code).  Among others, he suspected that the British were reading the dispatches in the American "Black" code, not the Germans. He concluded that was not the case, but considerable ill feeling had been aroused (Churchill had told Roosevelt in February 1942 that he had stopped British work on American diplomatic codes, a warning to tighten them up).

McCormack resigned on April 23, 1946, in a memo to Dean Acheson, then acting Secretary of State, with the following explanation:    The series of Departmental Orders issued yesterday,r elating to the intelligence organization within the Department, provide for dismembering the Office of Research and Intelligence and transferring its functions to a group of separate research divisions under the Political Offices, and they contain other organizational provisions that I regard as unworkable and unsound.  I had hoped that the compromise proposal worked out by Colonel Tyler Wood, which appeared to meet all points of substance raised by the Political Offices, would be found acceptable, and I was therefore disappointed to find that the orders as issued conformed almost exactly to the so-called "Russell Plan," proposed by the Assistant Secretary for Administration last December.  ...While the plan adopted will give needed reinforcements to the Political Offices, and in that respect will be beneficial, it will make impossible the establishment of a real intelligence unit within the Department; that it will weaken the Department, vis-a-vis the military components of the National Intelligence Authority, who already have the advantage of a three to one representation in the Central Intelligence Group, as compared with that of the State Department; and that it will prevent the carrying out of the long-range plans for postwar intelligence which you and I had in mind when you asked me to come into the Department...  Feeling as I do that the organization as now to be set up is unsound and not in the best interests of the Government, I cannot conscientiously present the case to the Senate, and I believe that the best interests of the Department and the Government will be served by my immediate resignation.    (In its obituary, the New York Times stated that McCormack had resigned in October 1946 "after a sharp difference in opinion over the organization of the department's intelligence functions.") 
He returned to Cravath in 1946.

In January 1952, McCormack reported to the Secretary of War "to study certain aspects of military intelligence."

Personal life and death
On May 31, 1930, McCormack married Winifred Byron Smith and had three sons.

McCormack served as chair of the Board of Visitors for Columbia Law School.  In his law practice, he "devoted much of his time to the affairs of the late Maj. Edwin H. Armstrong, prominent inventor in the radio field."

Alfred McCormack died age 55 on January 12, 1956, of cancer at Greenwich Hospital in Greenwich, Connecticut.

Awards
 1945:  Distinguished Service Medal (United States)
 (date?):  Order of the British Empire, Honorary Commander

Legacy
Columbia Law School as a chair named the "Alfred McCormack Professor of Law" in his honor, whose recipients include Robert E. Scott and E. Allan Farnsworth.

See also
 Magic (cryptography)
 Military Intelligence Division (United States)
 Military Intelligence Corps (United States Army)
 The Pond (intelligence organization)
 1943 BRUSA Agreement

References

External sources
 Redding Land Trust - Col. Alfred McCormack Preserve
 Letter From the Secretary of State’s Special Assistant for Research and Intelligence (McCormack) to the President’s Chief of Staff (Leahy) (October 31, 1945)
 19 June 1950: To: Alfred McCormack. From: Roy W. Howard

Military intelligence officers of World War II
American lawyers
United States Department of State officials
Cravath, Swaine & Moore partners
United States Department of War officials
1901 births
1956 deaths